The Rivière du Sud-Ouest (English: River of South-West) is a tributary of the Yamaska River. It flows in the administrative region of Montérégie, on the South Shore of the St. Lawrence River, in Quebec, Canada. Its course towards the northeast crosses the municipalities of:
 Farnham, in Brome-Missisquoi Regional County Municipality;
 Sainte-Brigide-d'Iberville, in Le Haut-Richelieu Regional County Municipality;
 Saint-Césaire, in Rouville Regional County Municipality.

Geography 

The main hydrographic slopes adjacent to the Southwest River are:
 North side: rivière des Hurons;
 East side: Écossais River, Yamaska River;
 South side: Pike River, Missisquoi Bay;
 West side: Bleury stream, Richelieu River.

The "Rivière du Sud-Ouest" rises from various agricultural streams located around the hamlet Ménardville, west of the village of Farnham, northwest of the village of Sainte-Sabine, south of the village of Sainte-Brigide-d'Iberville, south of route 104 and south of Canadian National Railway section.

From its head (draining a small area of marsh), the Southwest river flows 5.9 km north in agricultural area to the Canadian National railway; 3.0 km north to route 104 in the village of Sainte-Brigide-d'Iberville; 3.6 km north to Martel Creek; 2.4 km northeasterly to autoroute 10; and 3.5 km north-east to its mouth.

The South-West river flows on the west bank of the Yamaska River in the municipality of Saint-Césaire. This mouth is 2.6 km upstream from the Saint-Césaire bridge over the Yamaska River (route 112) and 2.8 km downstream from the Autoroute 10 bridge.

Toponymy 

The toponym "Rivière du Sud-Ouest" was officially registered on December 5, 1968 at the Bank of Place Names of the Commission de toponymie du Québec.

Notes and references

See also 

 Yamaska River, a stream
 Rivière des Hurons (Richelieu River tributary), a stream
 Écossais River, a stream
 Saint-Césaire, a municipality
 Sainte-Brigide-d'Iberville, a municipality
 Farnham, a municipality
 Rouville Regional County Municipality
 Brome-Missisquoi Regional County Municipality
 List of rivers of Quebec

Rivers of Montérégie
Rouville Regional County Municipality
Brome-Missisquoi Regional County Municipality
Le Haut-Richelieu Regional County Municipality